The 2016–17 Nemzeti Bajnokság I/B is the 49th season of the Nemzeti Bajnokság I/B,  Hungary's second tier Handball league.

Team information

Western Group
The following 14 clubs compete in the NB I/B (Western) during the 2016–17 season:

Eastern Group
The following 14 clubs compete in the NB I/B (Eastern) during the 2016–17 season:

League table

Western Group

Pld - Played; W - Won; D - Drawn; L - Lost; GF - Goals for; GA - Goals against; Diff - Difference; Pts - Points.
(C) Champion; (P) Promoted; (R) Relegated.

Eastern Group

Pld - Played; W - Won; D - Drawn; L - Lost; GF - Goals for; GA - Goals against; Diff - Difference; Pts - Points.
(C) Champion; (P) Promoted; (R) Relegated.

See also
 2016–17 Magyar Kupa
 2016–17 Nemzeti Bajnokság I
 2016–17 Nemzeti Bajnokság II

References

External links
 Hungarian Handball Federaration 
 handball.hu

Handball leagues in Hungary
Nemzeti Bajnoksag I/B Women